Montréal, arts interculturels (MAI) is a multidisciplinary cultural organization of Montreal created in 1999. It is located on Jeanne-Mance Street. It opened in 1999, and exhibits contemporary art, dance, music, theatre, painting, sculpture, and video. The mission of MAI is to facilitate and initiate intercultural relations.

Description 
The MAI is a non-profit organization whose mission is to support and promote intercultural artistic practices in order to enable a dialogue between cultures in Montreal. MAI subsidizes and presents projects in dance, theatre, visual and media arts, spoken word, etc. It accompanies emerging or established artists and particularly supports artists from culturally diverse backgrounds. The organization has a theatre, a gallery, a café and two rehearsal rooms.

History 
In 1990, the Regroupement pour le développement des pratiques artistiques interculturelles was created. In 1989, the group decided to work on the creation of a new cultural space in Montreal, and it was in Milton Park, on Jeanne-Mance Street, that the MAI was established in 1999. The organization then had a café, a gallery and two rehearsal rooms. In 2005, the MAI inaugurated its artist accompaniment program, which will be renamed "Complices" in 2018. Initially, the program was primarily aimed at Indigenous and culturally diverse artists, but the program has gradually expanded to include artists with disabilities, from linguistic minorities or LGBTQAAI communities.

Missions 
The MAI's main mission is to encourage dialogue by presenting intercultural artistic approaches to issues of identity, gender, sexual orientation, religion, etc. Thus, the organization has two main missions. The first is to accompany artists in their development and/or promotion in order to stimulate hybrid productions and transversal, multidisciplinary and intercultural approaches. The second mission aims to address a varied audience and to propose a programming as well as inclusive workshops for both connoisseurs and neophytes. To do so, the MAI proposes accompanying programmes as well as an annual programme. Faced with the lack of cultural diversity in the contemporary arts in Quebec, the MAI has also put forward the contemporary arts of the Black communities.

Programmation 

Each year the MAI proposes a season programmation, featuring some twenty artists. The program includes exhibitions (an average of four per year), dance, music and other performances in the MAI theatre and shows presented outside the walls in partnership with other cultural spaces in Montreal. Several artists who have gained notoriety in Quebec, Canada and sometimes internationally have been part of the programming in previous years, such as Manuel Mathieu, Hannah Claus, Jean-Daniel Rohrer, Dana Michel, Su-Feh Lee, Daina Ashbee, The Dancers of Damelahamid, etc. In recent years, the difficulties for foreign artists to enter Canada have caused some problems for the organization.

The MAI 2018-2019 season is entitled How Deep is Your Love ? and presents nearly thirty events in dance, music, theatre, interdisciplinary arts, spoken word and five exhibitions in visual arts.

Public outreach Public+
The Public+ programme was inaugurated in 2009. It aims to propose activities in parallel with the exhibitions and the official MAI programme in order to raise questions and debates or simply to allow interaction.

The MAI's location in Milton Parc, between the Plateau Mont-Royal and downtown, allows it to address a variety of audiences. It is a central district of Montreal where several languages are spoken as well as several communities: academic, residential and professional. The site reflects the MAI's desire to offer inclusive programming and support that brings together various audiences and communities in an ongoing search for exchange.

Artist support program : Complices 
Each year, the MAI offers to accompany artists by providing financial support or assistance in their professional development or visibility in Montreal. Through its studios, the organization also offers work spaces and residencies to support promising projects and productions. The MAI offers, among other things, support programs twinned with the Conseil des Arts de Montréal. The MAI is also a meeting place for artists who can find contact both with the public and with other artists, offering the prospect of collaborative projects.

In 2005, MAI launched its mentorship program (now called "Alliance") for racialized and newly immigrated artists in Canada. Since then, MAI has expanded the scope of this program to include artists of First Nations, Inuit and Métis descent, artists who are deaf or disabled, members of the LGBTQQIP2SAA community, and senior artists.

Alliance is a unique mentoring model in Canada. Through grants, Alliance provides support for the professional and creative development of artists (hybrid artistic practices) within a solid and flexible structure. The support grants are designed for and by artists, defined and managed with the artists and/or collectives, who determine the services they need, in a short or long term format (3 to 18 months). Since 2005, more than 317 artists, companies and/or collectives have been supported by the Alliance program: accomplice, associate, collaborator, co-conspirator, and ultimately development centre - providing a safe and secure space for professional and creative development within a solid, yet flexible structure (recipients are selected annually by a committee following a public call for proposals).

It was within this support structure, in 2018, that MAI also began to position itself as a producer (through La Ruche, a platform through which funds are injected into research, creation and/or production of artist residencies, with funds placed directly in the hands of the artists). This role as a production partner, relatively new for MAI, focuses on facilitation, navigating between the artist's vision and his or her capacities, valuing the relationship while rethinking the binarities. Since September 2018, MAI has co-produced the following Canadian shows: Lévriers by Sophie Gee, Numbers increase as you count by Ülfet Sevdi, Seeds Cast Afar From Our Roots by Angie Cheng, Winnie Ho, & Chi Long, Radio III by Elisa Harkins, Zoë Poluch & Hanako Hoshimi-Caines, Real's Fiction by Benjamin Kamino, and the international co-production terrestrial with jumatatu m. poe.

References

External links 
 Site officiel

1999 establishments in Quebec
Art galleries established in 1999
Art in Montreal
Art museums and galleries in Quebec
Contemporary art galleries in Canada
Music venues completed in 1999
Performing arts centres in Canada
Sculpture galleries in Canada
Theatres completed in 1999
Theatres in Montreal
Organizations based in Montreal